Scotland Yard is a baseball park located in Highland Park, Texas, and was the home field of TCL Highland Park Blue Sox from 2004 to 2005 before moving to Plano, Texas for the 2006 season. It is the home field of the Highland Park Scots baseball team.

References

External links
 Highland Park High School

Baseball venues in Texas
High school baseball venues in the United States
High school sports in Texas
Minor league baseball venues